Rita Irene Ottervik (born 11 September 1966 in Hitra) is a Norwegian politician from the Labour Party who has served as the mayor of Trondheim since 2003.

She has served as a secretary in the Workers' Youth League and political advisor at the Office of the Prime Minister under Thorbjørn Jagland (1996–1997). She was elected as a member of Trondheim city council in 1999, and served four years before becoming mayor.

Ottervik was considered a candidate for a cabinet post following the elections of 2005 and 2009, but she declined the offers on both occasions in favor of continuing her tenure as mayor.

In 2022, Ottervik announced that she wouldn't be seeking re-election in the 2023 local elections.

References

1966 births
Living people
People from Hitra
Mayors of Trondheim
Labour Party (Norway) politicians
Women mayors of places in Norway
20th-century Norwegian women politicians
20th-century Norwegian politicians